This is a list of Trinity College Dublin student organisations. As of 2020, Trinity College Dublin had over 120 student societies which were operating under the Dublin University Central Societies Committee.

Types of organisations

Clubs
Trinity College has 49 sports clubs affiliated to the Dublin University Central Athletic Club. The Central Athletic Club is made up of five elected committees who oversee the development of sport in the college: the Executive Committee is responsible for all activities; the Captains' Committee represents the 49 club captains and awards University Colours (Pinks), the Pavilion Bar Committee runs the private members' bar, the Pavilion Members' Committee and the Sports Facilities Committee.

The oldest clubs include the Dublin University Cricket Club (1835) and Dublin University Boat Club (1836). Dublin University Rifle Club was first founded in 1840 however the club under its current format was reconstituted in 1962. Dublin University Football Club which plays rugby football was founded in 1854 and is the world's oldest documented "football club". The Dublin University Hockey Club was founded in 1893. The Dublin University Harriers and Athletic Club was founded in 1885.

There are several graduate sport clubs that exist separate to the Central Athletic Club including the Dublin University Museum Players (cricket), the Lady Elizabeth Boat Club (rowing) and the Mary Lyons Memorial Mallets (croquet).

Publications
Trinity College's student publications range from the serious to the satirical. All student publications are administered by the Dublin University Publications Committee (often known as 'Pubs') who maintain and administer the Publications room (located in House 6) and all the associated equipment needed to publish its newspapers and magazines.

Trinity News is Ireland's oldest student newspaper having been first printed in 1947 and being in regular circulation since 1953. It is published on a fortnightly basis producing 12 issues in total during the academic year. The paper has won a number of Irish Student Media Awards in the past, winning each of the "Newspaper of the Year", "Editor of the Year" and "Journalist of the Year" numerous times.

The University Times is Trinity's newer student newspaper. Founded in 2009, it was named Irish Student Newspaper of the Year in its first year, an award won by Trinity News in the three previous years. It is funded by Trinity College Dublin Students' Union but its Editorial Committee makes editorial decisions independently of the Union. It replaced the University Record.

Student magazines in publication include The Piranha (satirical), Tuathal (Irish-language magazine produced by An Cumann Gaelach which has been nominated for Irish Society Publication of the Year) the generalist TCD Miscellany (one of Ireland's oldest magazines), the arts-orientated Icarus (magazine) and the film magazine Trinity Film Review. Other publications supported by the Dublin University Publications Committee include the Student Economic Review, which is a journal produced and organised by students of Economics, the Law Review and the Trinity Student Medical Journal as well as The Attic which is a collection of student writing produced by the Dublin University Literary Society, and The (Renegade) Rant and Rave, a literary criticism magazine. Older titles, no longer in publication, include Central Review, Trinity Intellectual Times, the Afro-Caribbean Journal, Harlot, Evoke, and Alternate.

Societies

Trinity College has over 120 societies, each of which operates under the aegis of the Dublin University Central Societies Committee. This committee is composed of the treasurers of each of the societies within the College. Society sizes vary, with several claiming to be the largest in the college with thousands of members, while smaller groups may have only 40-50 members.

Situated within the Graduates Memorial Building is the oldest of Ireland's such societies, the College Historical Society (The Hist). Founded in 1770, the society has a history in the promotion of oratory and composition. It is the oldest debating society in Ireland, and "perhaps" the oldest student society in the world. Over the past three centuries, it has been addressed by the world’s pre-eminent thinkers and orators. The society meets each Wednesday evening to debate motions of interest in the chamber of the Graduate Memorial Building (GMB).

Another such society is the University Philosophical Society (The Phil) which shares the GMB and promotes discourse among students. The Society can traces it origins to 1853 when it was set up as a paper reading society, inspired by the Dublin Philosophical Society. While the Phil still hosts paper readings, its primary functions is as a debating society. Throughout the twentieth century, there was ongoing discussion about the possibility of a merger between the Student Representative Council, the Hist, the Phil, and the Eliz (The Dublin University Elizabethan Society founded in 1905). In 1981, the Eliz merged with the Phil and today it remains a subcommittee of the Phil promoting the involvement of women in debating. The Phil meets each Thursday evening of Term to debate motions in the chamber of the GMB.

Other societies include Vincent de Paul Society (VDP), which organises charitable activities in the local community; DU Players, a student-drama society which hosts more than 50 shows and events a year in the Samuel Beckett Theatre; The DU Film Society (formerly DU Filmmakers, formerly the DU "Videographic Society", founded in 1987) which organises filmmakers and film-lovers on campus through workshops, screenings, and production funding; The DU Radio Society, known as Trinity FM, broadcasts student made productions on a special events licence on FM frequency 97.3FM for six weeks a year; The Trinity LGBT society, which is the oldest LGBT society in Ireland and celebrated its 25th anniversary in the 2007/2008 year; The Dublin University Comedy Society, known as DU Comedy, hosts comedy events for its members and hosts comedy gigs on campus; The Dance Society, known as "dudance", which provides classes in Latin and ballroom dancing, as well as running events around other dance styles such as swing dancing. In 2011 the Laurentian Society was revived. This society played a role as a society for the few Catholic students who studied at Trinity while "the Ban" (on Catholic attendance) was still in force

Representative bodies

Undergraduates are represented by the Trinity College Dublin Students' Union (TCDSU). Its primary role is to provide a representative channel between undergraduates and the University and College authorities. It represents both undergraduates and postgraduates in matters external to the university. The Executive, the Finance and Services Committee and Sabbatical Officers manage the business and affairs of the Union. The Students' Union Communications Officer is responsible for the publication of the University Times (formerly the University Record), an editorially independent student newspaper.

Postgraduates are represented by the Graduate Students' Union. Its primary role is to provide a recognised representative channel between postgraduates and the University and College authorities. It primarily consists of two full-time officers, the President, and Vice-President. The GSU President is an ex officio member of the College Board. The Vice-President also acts as the GSU's Education and Welfare Officer. The Graduate Students' Union publish the "Journal of Postgraduate Research" on an annual basis.

List of societies

An Cumann Gaelach

An Cumann Gaelach, founded in 1907 by former President of Ireland Dubhghlas de hÍde.

Biological Association
The Biosoc is one of the largest societies in Trinity College Dublin. The main role of the Biosoc was originally to provide a forum of discussion in the field of Natural Science, however, over the years it began to change this role eventually becoming a social society for medical students. It runs the "Med Day" charity event every November, raising money for various university associated hospitals, including neonatal care in the Coombe Women & Infants University Hospital and Rotunda Hospital, acute stroke care in St. James's Hospital and breast cancer screening programme in Tallaght University Hospital.

Choral Society
The University of Dublin Choral Society is the largest choir in Trinity College Dublin. It is also the oldest university choral society in Great Britain and Ireland, having been founded in 1837. The society performs two concerts each year, one at the end of each term. The tradition that members wear the formal academic gown for performances is upheld and concerts take place in the College Exam Hall and College Chapel.

College Historical Society

The College Historical Society (or "Hist") is Ireland's oldest debating society, having been established within the college in 1770.

College Theological Society
The College Theological Society, commonly known as "The Theo", was founded in 1830. The society's original purpose was to train ordinands "in ecclesiastical history and polemical divinity". According to its constitution, the objective of the society is to afford members the opportunity to study theology and to "encourage the practice of written composition, and extempore speaking". It also "promotes inter-religious dialogue" and discusses the role of religion within society. It has covered topics including human rights, current affairs, faith and the climate crisis.

In addition to discussion and debate, members also meet to listen to guest speakers during weekly Monday events in the Chamber of the Graduates Memorial Building. The Theo is based in the Bram Stoker Room in the same building.

Comedy Society
The Dublin University Comedy Society (Comedy Soc.) hosts comedy events for its members and has hosted gigs on campus from comedians such as Andrew Maxwell, David O'Doherty, Neil Delamere and Colin Murphy. The society has existed in one form or another for many years, going under the name "The Dead Parrot Society" in the 1990s but experienced a massive resurgence in activity in 2007. The society signed up over 700 members in 2007, and over 2500 members in 2008. The society publishes a comedy magazine called Goldfish, runs stand-up comedy workshops, and a variety of themed nights out.

Dublin University Players
Dublin University Players hosts up to 50 shows and events a year in its own theatre in the Samuel Beckett Centre. Notable ex-members of the group include the actress and writer Pauline McLynn (Mrs Doyle from Father Ted), Stanley Townsend, Jack Gleeson, and Doireann Garrihy. Honorary Patrons of the society include Garry Hynes, Bill Nighy, Paule Constable, Selina Cartmell and Michael D. Higgins.

Joly Geological Society
Named after John Joly, the Joly Geological Society was founded in 1960. As well as social events the society organises field trips.

Laurentian Society

The Laurentian Society is a society named after Saint Laurence O’Toole (Lorcán Ua Tuathail in Irish), and concerned with relevant issues from a Catholic perspective. It existed with no interruptions between the academic years 1952-3 and 2001-2, being then the Catholic society of Trinity College. Back then, the society used to hold talks and was engaged in Charitable activities. It was revived as a cultural society in September 2011.

LGBT Society / Q Soc
Trinity LGBT, later rebranded as Q Soc, is a society which supports the needs of lesbian, gay, bisexual and transgender students and their friends in Trinity College Dublin. The LGBT organises social and community events while offering help and support for LGBT students and providing a safe space for LGBT students on campus.
Trinity College recognised the society in 1982 making it the oldest student LGBT society in Ireland. Trinity LGBT was founded in 1982 as "Dublin University Gay Soc", emerging directly from the Sexual Liberation Movement of David Norris and other Irish gay rights pioneers who were active in Trinity in the early 1970s.

LitSoc / Trinity Literary Society
The Trinity College Dublin Literary Society (LitSoc) is the foremost society for the creation and celebration of literature in Trinity College Dublin, with a constitutional aim "to kindle and encourage a love of writing, literature and literary culture among the staff and students of Trinity College". Initially begun as a branch of the English Speaking Union, the society was revived in 1996 and changed its name to the Trinity Literary Society in 1998. LitSoc holds an average of two major events every week, in addition to regular writing workshops, book clubs, open mics and guest speakers, and is open for library hours daily from 12 to 3pm. The society was nominated for 6 awards at the Central Societies Committee awards ceremony in March 2017, winning Best Online Presence, Best Medium Society and Overall Society of the Year.<ref name="CSC Awards"

Mathsoc
Dublin University Mathematical Society, affectionately referred to as the Mathsoc by its members, was founded in 1923 and has had many famous members since its foundation, including Ireland's only Nobel Physics Laureate Ernest Walton who helped found it. The Mathsoc has a society room in college, in the School of Mathematics, which contains the Mathsoc library.

Society For International Affairs (SoFIA)
The Society for International Affairs (SoFIA) aims to promote the discussion of diplomacy and diplomatic affairs, to give visibility to current international affairs and provide a platform for discussion and networking. It also seeks to acquaint students with the activities and mechanisms of embassies and foreign affairs departments and, guide students considering a diplomatic career.

Traditional Music Society
DU Traditional Music Society (TradSoc) promotes traditional Irish music, song and dance in the college. The society hosts informal music sessions and recitals, runs a céilí band and a lilting choir, as well as organising trips to traditional music festivals in Ireland and the UK. The society received the awards of Most Improved Society (2015) and Best Small Society (2016) from the Central Societies Committee.

Trinitones 

Trinitones is an all-male acappella ensemble established in 2012 which is one of the four choirs which make up "Trinity College Singers Society", along with Trinity Singers, Boydell Singers and fellow acappella group, Trinity Belles. Established in 2012, the group have toured Ireland and Australia and have released several covers of popular songs, most notably a viral music video of an acappella arrangement of Teenage Dirtbage by Wheatus in 2013.

Trinity Arts Festival Society
The Trinity Arts Festival Society coordinates a week-long arts festival within Trinity College Dublin. Established in 2006, the festival is organised by a society committee with a goal to "promote the arts and arts-based societies within Trinity College and around Dublin".

The festival society has received a number of awards from the Central Societies Committee of Trinity College at its annual Society of the Year Awards. The society were also awarded second place in the college's "Equality Champions Awards" in April 2017.

Trinity FM
Trinity FM, originally created in 1998, is run by 10 full-time volunteers. It broadcasts from 3pm to midnight during college term at 92.1 FM and online through the website trinityfm.org. Trinity FM has collaborated with UNICEF and has organised acoustic sessions which take place throughout the year. Acts such as Miracle Bell, Frightened Rabbit, The Flaws and Mice Parade and Duke Special have performed. The radio station organises covered gigs with participants from various colleges in Dublin playing their favourite covers. The station has made connections with the European Parliament in Brussels, where different committee members and general members of the society travel to the EU parliament to discuss the future of radio, politics, and how students can make a difference at special events hosted by the EU. In 2013, Trinity FM was awarded best medium society and best overall society at the Central Societies Committee annual ball.

Wolfe Tone Cumann / Fianna Fáil Society
Trinity College Fianna Fáil cumann (branch) is named in honour of Theobald Wolfe Tone. The Cumann was officially constituted in 1967 and was initially named in honour of Erskine Childers, but was renamed in 1998 in celebration of the bicentenary of the 1798 Rebellion. It hosts regular meetings and participates in campaigns in support of Fianna Fáil and Ógra Fianna Fáil. Notable former members of the Cumann who have since entered national politics in Ireland include Thomas Byrne, Seán Haughey, Jack Chambers, James Lawless, Averil Power, Mary Lou McDonald, Mary Harney and Dara Calleary.

University Philosophical Society

The University Philosophical Society (or "Phil") is a paper-reading and debating society which was founded in 1853. It facilitates debating in Trinity through chamber debates and competitive debating, both internally and externally.

Defunct societies
 Astronomy and Space Society (Trinity)
 Karting Society
 One World Society
 Speech and Language Pathology Society
 Dublin University Real Estate Society (DURES)

References

External links
 trinitysocieties.ie

Clubs and societies in the Republic of Ireland
Trinity College Dublin student organisations
Lists of student societies
Student organisations